During the 1991–92 season, Red Star Belgrade competed in the Yugoslav First League, Yugoslav Cup, European Cup, European Super Cup and Intercontinental Cup.

Squad

Results

Yugoslav First League

Yugoslav Cup

European Cup

First round

Second round

Group stage

European Super Cup

Intercontinental Cup

See also
 List of Red Star Belgrade seasons

References

Red Star Belgrade seasons
Red Star
Red Star
Yugoslav football championship-winning seasons